Chevy Chase Circle is a traffic circle (or roundabout) straddling the border of Chevy Chase, Washington, D.C. and Chevy Chase, Maryland. It sits upon the convergence of Western Avenue, Grafton Street, Magnolia Parkway, Chevy Chase Parkway NW, and Connecticut Avenue (signed as Maryland Route 185 in Maryland). 

In 1938, Francis Griffith Newlands Memorial Fountain was erected in the center of the Circle, commemorating Representative and Senator Francis Newlands of Nevada. The east and west sides of a grassy ring within the Circle's interior each contain a Garden Club of America entrance marker that denotes Connecticut Avenue's entry into the District of Columbia.

All Saints' Episcopal Church opened on Chevy Chase Circle on December 1, 1901. It was built in the Gothic style of architecture on land donated by The Chevy Chase Land Company.  Rev. Dr. Thomas S. Childs was its first pastor.

Chevy Chase Presbyterian Church, also on Chevy Chase Circle, was built in 1911. Rev. Dr. Hubert Rex Johnson was its first pastor.

The Shrine of the Most Blessed Sacrament Church was canonically established in 1911. A simple, temporary church was built at that time, with construction of the present church beginning in 1925. The cornerstone was blessed by Bishop Thomas J. Shahan, rector of the Catholic University of America. The new Church opened on November 6, 1927. Archbishop Michael Joseph Curley officiated at the dedicatory service.

See also

Chevy Chase, Maryland
Chevy Chase, Washington, D.C.
Connecticut Avenue

References

External links
 Chevy Chase Circle in its youth
 Three Things That Happened at Chevy Chase Circle

Chevy Chase, Maryland
Chevy Chase (Washington, D.C.)
Roads in Montgomery County, Maryland
Squares, plazas, and circles in Washington, D.C.